Takai is a Local Government Area in Kano State, Nigeria. Its headquarters are in the town of Takai to the north of the area on the A237 highway.

It has an area of 598 km and a population of 202,743 at the 2006 census.

The postal code of the area is 712.

Notable people
Muhammad Baffa Takai – Current chairman of Takai and former Kano State commissioner for science and technology

References

Local Government Areas in Kano State